Lok Ma Chau Control Point is an immigration control point in Lok Ma Chau, Yuen Long District, New Territories, Hong Kong, which is on the border between Hong Kong and mainland China. It opened in 1989 as the third road crossing between the then British dependent territory and China. It started providing 24-hour passenger clearance in January 2003, and is still the only Hong Kong control point with Shenzhen in mainland China to do so.

Before reaching this point, vehicles must pass through police checkpoints along  to Lok Ma Chau Control Point. Permits must be carried in order to pass these points and to travel to the control points.

History
Lok Ma Chau Control Point was the third road crossing built between Hong Kong and China, after Man Kam To and Sha Tau Kok. It was built as part of the New Territories Circular Road project, and was intended to relieve the congested Man Kam To Control Point. Construction began in December 1985. Customs, police, and other buildings were designed by the Architectural Services Department. The new crossing opened on 29 December 1989, initially only using the Eastern Bridge, providing two lanes. The Western Bridge was opened to traffic on 18 October 1991, adding two more lanes.

In October 1993, Governor Chris Patten announced a plan to open the crossing on a 24-hour basis. This was strongly supported by the territory's business community, but criticised by villagers due to increased noise and dust pollution. Overnight border crossing was introduced on 4 November 1994 (i.e. after 3 November 1994). The control point began providing 24-hour passenger clearance from 27 January 2003 (i.e. after 26 January 2003).

Construction of a new four-lane bridge, directly to the east of the existing two bridges, was proposed by the government in early 2003 to meet increasing traffic demand. Construction began in November 2003 and was completed in December 2004. The new bridge opened to traffic in January 2005.

Statistics
In 2015, Lok Ma Chau Control Point handled a total of 37 million people (including both drivers and passengers), making it the second-busiest road control point in Hong Kong, after Shenzhen Bay Control Point (which handled 41.5 million). For comparison, the nearby Lok Ma Chau Spur Line rail crossing handled 61.9 million.

Public transport

Shuttle bus from Lok Ma Chau Control Point
Cross border shuttle buses between Huanggang Port in Shenzhen and San Tin Public Transport Interchange (PTI) (less than 2 km from Lok Ma Chau Control Point), stop en route at Lok Ma Chau Control Point. These shuttle buses are scheduled to run at least every 15 minutes, 365 days per year. San Tin PTI offers connecting public transport across Hong Kong mostly but not exclusively within the New Territories.

Franchised bus routes from San Tin PTI
KMB 76K, 276B, N73

Green minibus routes from San Tin PTI
 NT 44B, 44B1, 75, 78, 79S, 605, 616S

Red minibus routes from San Tin PTI
 Un-numbered service to/from Kwun Tong (via Sha Tin, CUHK, Tai Po, Fanling, Sheung Shui). This infrequent service runs mostly as a night service.

Non-franchised bus routes from Lok Ma Chau Control Point

The non-franchised buses bypass San Tin PTI direct to their destinations.

 Kwun Tong (Lam Tin station) to Huanggang Port
 Tsuen Wan (Discovery Park) to Huanggang Port
 Jordan (Austin Road) to Huanggang Port
 Wan Chai Ferry terminal and Shun Tak Centre to Huanggang Port
 Mong Kok (Arran Street) to Huanggang Port
 Kam Sheung Road station to Huanggang Port

Taxis 
 NT Taxis
 Urban Taxis

References

Mai Po
Closed Area
Lok Ma Chau
China–Hong Kong border crossings